Little Black Creek flows into the Black River near Bardwell Mill, New York.

References 

Rivers of Oneida County, New York
Rivers of New York (state)
Rivers of Herkimer County, New York